The following is a list of Ministers of Transport, Maritime Affairs and Communication of Turkey. The post was established in 1939, with Ali Çetinkaya as the first office holder. As of 2017, the office holder is Ahmet Arslan and the office has been held by 64 people.

List of Ministers of Transport, Maritime Affairs and Communication

Lists of government ministers of Turkey
Transport ministers
Communications ministers